SASM (short for SimpleASM) is a free and open source cross-platform integrated development environment for the NASM, MASM, GAS and FASM assembly languages. It features syntax highlighting and includes a debugger.

SASM is intended to allow users to easily develop and run programs written in assembly language. It was written by Dmitriy "Dman95" Manushin and licensed under the GNU GPL v3.0. It is written in C++ and uses the multi-platform Qt toolkit.

Features 
 Four assemblers - NASM, MASM, GAS and FASM are supported
 Syntax highlighting with tunable color scheme
 Handy graphical debugger
 Program is translated into Russian, English, Turkish, Chinese, German, Italian, Polish, Hebrew, Spanish
 Input/output macro library
 Ability to work with multiple files using tabs
 All required components are included (gdb, gcc, nasm, masm, fasm, gas)

References

External links
 
 
 Open Build Service repository with installation packages for Linux
 NASM Develop IDE

Assemblers